Wilson Shedric Hill (January 19, 1863 – February 14, 1921) was a U.S. Representative from Mississippi.

Biography
Born near Lodi, Choctaw County (now Montgomery County), Mississippi. Hill attended the common schools and the University of Mississippi at Oxford.
He was graduated from Cumberland School of Law at Cumberland University, Lebanon, Tennessee, in 1884.
He was admitted to the bar in 1884 and commenced practice in Winona, Mississippi.
He served as a member of the State House of Representatives in 1885.
He served as district attorney for the fifth judicial district of Mississippi 1891–1903.
He served as a member of the city council of Winona 1892–1894.

Hill was elected as a Democrat to the Fifty-eighth, Fifty-ninth, and Sixtieth Congresses (March 4, 1903 – March 3, 1909).
He was an unsuccessful candidate for renomination in 1908.
He resumed the practice of law in Greenwood, Mississippi.
He served as delegate to the Democratic National Convention in 1912.
He served as district attorney for the northern judicial district 1914–1921.
He died in Greenwood, Mississippi, February 14, 1921.
He was interred in Oakwood Cemetery, Winona, Mississippi.

References

1863 births
1921 deaths
People from Montgomery County, Mississippi
University of Mississippi alumni
Cumberland University alumni
Cumberland School of Law alumni
Mississippi lawyers
Mississippi city council members
Democratic Party members of the Mississippi House of Representatives
Democratic Party members of the United States House of Representatives from Mississippi
People from Winona, Mississippi
19th-century American lawyers